Takashi Matsumoto is the name of:

 Takashi Matsumoto (poet) (1906–1956)
 Takashi Matsumoto (lyricist) (born 1949)